

Broadcasters

France

Asia

Europe

North America

Oceania

Other regions and countries 
Europe – Eurosport and the Eurosport Player

See also
Tennis on television
Tennis_on_CBS#Commentators
Tennis_on_NBC#Commentators
Tennis_on_ESPN#Announcers
Tennis_on_USA#Commentators
ITV_Sport#Tennis
ITV_Sport#List of current ITV Sport personnel
Eurosport#Tennis
Tennis_Channel#On-air_personalities

References

External links
French Open Archives - Awful Announcing
Broadcasters - Roland-Garros
French Open - Sports Media Watch

ESPN
USA Network Sports
NBC Sports
ESPN2
CBS Sports
ITV Sport
Eurosport
Lists of tennis commentators
French Open
Sports broadcasting contracts